Red Duster may refer to either:

 Red Duster (ensign) - slang term for the Red Ensign
 Red Duster (missile) - Rainbow code used for the Bristol Bloodhound Surface to Air missile